Liz Nugent is an Irish novelist, born in Dublin in 1967. She is the author of five crime fiction novels. The latest is Strange Sally Diamond, published in Ireland & UK in March 2023.

Biography

Liz Nugent attended Holy Child Killiney, in County Dublin. At the age of six she suffered a brain injury which left her with dystonia. After leaving school she moved to London for a time.

After her return to Ireland she enrolled in an acting course at the Gaiety School of Acting, but soon switched to stage management. She toured the world with Riverdance as a stage manager and later worked in an administrative role in RTÉ on its flagship soap Fair City.

During her time at RTÉ she was commissioned to write an animation series for Irish language TV station TG4 and also wrote a full-length radio play for RTE Radio. She subsequently won a European Broadcasting Union competition for a TV pilot.

Her first novel began life as a short story called Alice which made the shortlist of the RTÉ Francis McManus Short Story Competition in 2006. Further exploration into the main character produced her first best-selling novel Unravelling Oliver. She is published by Penguin Ireland and by Scout Press (Simon & Schuster) in the US.

Bibliography

 Unravelling Oliver (2014)
 Lying In Wait (2016)
 Skin Deep (2018)
 Our Little Cruelties (2020) (as Little Cruelties in United States)
 Strange Sally Diamond (2023)

Recognition
Unravelling Oliver
 Winner: Ireland AM Crime Fiction Award at the Bord Gáis Irish Book Awards in 2014  
 Longlist: Dublin International Literary Award (formerly the IMPAC) 2016

Lying In Wait
 Winner: Ryan Tubridy Listeners' Choice Award - Irish Book Awards 2016
 Longlist: Dublin International Literary Award 2018

Skin Deep 
 Winner of two An Post Irish Book Awards 2018: Irish Independent Crime Fiction Book of the Year and RTÉ Radio 1's The Ryan Tubridy Show Listeners’ Choice Award
 Longlist: Dublin International Literary Award 2020
 "Cancel All Plans for the Book You Can't Put Down Award" - Dead Good Books at the Harrogate Theakston's Old Peculier Crime Writing Festival in 2019

Our Little Cruelties 
 Listed by the New York Times as one of 7 recommended thrillers of 2020

Strange Sally Diamond
 Featured on BBC's Between the Covers sixth season

Other awards and bursaries 
In 2016, Nugent was awarded the Ireland Funds Monaco Bursary to be the Writer-in-Residence at The Princess Grace Irish Library in Monaco and was also Writer-In-Residence in the Centre Culturel Irlandais in Paris in April 2019.

She was awarded the Woman of the Year Award for Literature 2017.

In February 2021, she was awarded the James Joyce Award by the Literary & Historical Society of University College Dublin.

References

1967 births
Living people
Irish women novelists
Thriller writers
People from County Dublin
People educated at Holy Child Killiney
21st-century Irish novelists
21st-century Irish women writers